Panorama is the fourth studio album released by La Dispute. It was released on March 22, 2019, through Epitaph Records.

History 
The album was inspired by the drive that vocalist Jordan Dreyer and his partner would take from their home in the East Hills neighborhood of Grand Rapids, Michigan to Lowell, where the latter grew up.

Critical reception 

Wall of Sound gave the album a perfect score of 5/5 stating that "La Dispute have overcome their own shadow, creating an unflinching masterpiece, a new milestone in an uncompromising career of beauty and misery".

Track listing 

Notes
 All track titles are stylized in all capital letters.

Personnel
La Dispute
Jordan Dreyer – lead vocals, lyrics
Chad Sterenberg – guitar, trumpet, piano, effects
Adam Vass – bass guitar, guitar, artwork, layout
Corey Stroffolino – guitar
Brad Vander Lugt – drums, percussion, keyboards, synthesizers, programming

Additional personnel
Will Yip – producer, sound engineer, mixing
La Dispute – producer
Emily Lazar – mastering
Vince Ratti – mixing
Victor Mosquera – artwork 
Nick Steinhardt – graphic design
Chris Allgood – musical assistance

Charts

Panorama Remixed
On December 25, 2019, a remix album, featuring remixes by other artists, was released via BandCamp. All proceeds from the first day of downloads were donated to the Vera Institute of Justice. Panorama Remixed was released on other platforms on April 3, 2020.

Track listing

Notes
 All track titles are stylized in all capital letters, except inside the parentheses where the remix producers are denoted.

References 

2019 albums
La Dispute (band) albums
Epitaph Records albums
Albums produced by Will Yip